The 2011 Dartford Borough Council Election to the Dartford Borough Council was held on 5 May 2011.  The whole council (44 seats) was up for election and the Conservative Party retained overall control of the council.

The Conservatives won seats from both the Labour Party and the Swanscombe and Greenhithe Residents Association, as well as retaining all their gains at the previous election.

Election result
"Residents Association" is the Swanscombe and Greenhithe Residents Association.

Turnout: 41.21%

|}

Ward results
In multi-member wards, "majority" is taken as the difference in votes between the lowest of the elected and the highest of the not elected.

External links
Dartford Council Results

2011 English local elections
2011
2010s in Kent